Edwin Ernesto Salazar Ruiz (born 6 August 1991) is a Colombian footballer who plays as a forward for Rocha in Uruguay.

Club career
Salazar joined Finnish Veikkausliiga side PS Kemi on a one-year loan from Colombian Categoría Primera B side Orsomarso in February 2017.

Career statistics

Club

Notes

References

External links
 Profile at PS Kemi Kings

1991 births
Living people
Colombian footballers
Colombian expatriate footballers
Association football forwards
Categoría Primera B players
Veikkausliiga players
Kakkonen players
Liga Panameña de Fútbol players
Orsomarso S.C. footballers
Kemi City F.C. players
Rocha F.C. players
Costa del Este F.C. players
Colombian expatriate sportspeople in Finland
Colombian expatriate sportspeople in Uruguay
Colombian expatriate sportspeople in Panama
Expatriate footballers in Finland
Expatriate footballers in Uruguay
Expatriate footballers in Panama
PEPO Lappeenranta players